The 2019–20 Torino F.C. season was the club's 109th season of competitive football, 92nd season in the top division of Italian football and 75th season in Serie A. The club competed in Serie A, the Coppa Italia, and, following Milan's exclusion from the competition following their breach of Financial Fair Play regulations, in the UEFA Europa League, starting in the second qualifying round.

The season was coach Walter Mazzarri's second full campaign in charge of Torino, after replacing Siniša Mihajlović following his sacking during the 2017–18 season.

Players

Squad information
Last updated on 8 February 2020
Appearances include league matches only

Transfers

In

Loans in

Out

Loans out

Pre-season and friendlies

Competitions

Serie A

League table

Results summary

Results by round

Matches

Coppa Italia

UEFA Europa League

Second qualifying round

Third qualifying round

Play-off round

Statistics

Appearances and goals

|-
! colspan=14 style=background:#dcdcdc; text-align:center| Goalkeepers

|-
! colspan=14 style=background:#dcdcdc; text-align:center| Defenders

|-
! colspan=14 style=background:#dcdcdc; text-align:center| Midfielders

|-
! colspan=14 style=background:#dcdcdc; text-align:center| Forwards

|-
! colspan=14 style=background:#dcdcdc; text-align:center| Players transferred out during the season

Goalscorers

Last updated: 29 July 2020

Clean sheets

Last updated: 8 February 2020

Disciplinary record

Last updated: 8 February 2020

References

Torino F.C. seasons
Torino
Torino